The Nanjing Olympic Sports Centre Stadium is used mostly for football as well as for other sport of athletics. It is located in Hexi New Town, Nanjing, Jiangsu, China, and covers an area of 89.6 hectares, with a total construction area of about 401,000 square meters.

Served as the main venue for the 2014 Summer Youth Olympics and for the 2005 National Games of China, the Nanjing Olympic Sports Centre is the largest social utility project by the People's Government of Jiangsu Province. The 4 billion yuan Olympic standard complex was designed by HOK Sport (now Populous).

The Olympic Park includes a 61,443 seat multiuse stadium (Nanjing Olympic Sports Centre Stadium), 13,000 seat gymnasium, 4,000 seat FINA standard Aquatic complex, 4,000 seat Tennis Centre, 23,000 square meter Information Technology Centre, and various recreational sports fields.

Stadium 
The stadium costed 8.698 million yuan with the construction area of 136.34 thousand square meters, with 61,443 seats. It can host track and field, football and many other sporting events and large musical events.

The top of the building adopts a hyperboloid structure. The two red arches tilt 45 degrees outward and have a span of up to 361.58 meters. The track surface was products of the Italian company "Mondo (蒙多)". The screens was made by the Belgian manufacturer Barco, two screens at north and south sides have a total area of 560 square meters, the biggest in China.

The opening and closing ceremonies, track and field, football matches of the 2005 National Games of China were hosted here.

The stadium was also home of Jiangsu Football Club, they were 2020 Chinese Super League champions but the club was dissolved 3 months after the top-tier league win.

Arena 

The arena's construction area of about 6 million square meters, sub-main hall and the two parts of the museum, with 13,000 seats, of which a certain number of seats according to different competitions and activities need to be demolished and moved. There are 29 club boxes for indoor venues. In addition to the stadium could be held indoor track and field and cycling outside of all indoor sports competitions, cultural performances and exhibitions and other large events.

Swimming Pool 
Swimming pool in full compliance with FINA's construction standards, building area of nearly 3 million square meters, with 4,000 seats, and includes a swimming pool, diving pool, training pool and paddling pool.

Tennis Centre 
Tennis Centre of the construction area of nearly 4 million square meters, with 21 required standards in line with international competition venue can accommodate 4,000 people, including a final venue for two of the semi-final venue to accommodate 2,000 people, 14 open-air games venues and four indoor venues.

Information Technology Centre 
Information Technology Centre building area of about 23,000 square meters, is the Olympic Sports Centre management centre, it can hold various types of events and activities, press releases, news delivery and conduct of business services. News Centre south built a 100-meter-high elevator tower tourism, through the tower's viewing platforms overlooking the Olympic Sports Centre, Hexi New Urban Area and the nearby Riverview.

Notable events
Jay Chou – The Invincible World Tour (20 & 21 May 2017)
Joker Xue – I Think I've Seen You Somewhere Tour (15 July 2017)
JJ Lin – Sanctuary World Tour (23 June 2018)

References

External links 

 

Sports venues in Nanjing
Football venues in Nanjing
Athletics (track and field) venues in China
Tennis venues in China
Multi-purpose stadiums in China
Sports venues completed in 2005
Olympic Parks
Venues of the 2014 Summer Youth Olympics
Youth Olympic diving venues
Youth Olympic swimming venues
Sports complexes in China